is a Japanese composer, arranger and music producer, as well as founding member of the musical group Elements Garden.

He composed and arranged tracks on Nana Mizuki's singles Massive Wonders and Eternal Blaze, "Brave Phoenix" on the single Super Generation and the track "Tears' Night" on the album Alive & Kicking, composed the track Shin'ai and the music for "UNCHAIN∞WORLD" on the single Silent Bible. He composed and arranged the music for the track "Heart-shaped chant" on the single Secret Ambition and the track Justice to Believe. He composed the music for the track Mugen and the tracks "Trickster" and "DISCOTHEQUE" from the single Trickster. Along with his fellow Elements Garden members, he is the composer and arranger for the BanG Dream! franchise, including overseeing music production for its anime.

Works

Anime

Video games

References

External links
 
 
 Noriyasu Agematsu at Media Arts Database 
 Noriyasu Agematsu at Video Game Music Database
 Profile at www.ariamusic.co.jp (Japanese)

1978 births
Anime composers
Japanese composers
Japanese film score composers
Japanese male composers
Japanese male film score composers
Living people
Musicians from Nagano Prefecture
Video game composers